Whelnetham may refer to the following places in Suffolk, England:

Great Whelnetham
Little Whelnetham